This article contains a list of national cultural sites in Uganda in the Central Region of Uganda as defined by the Uganda Museum.

List 

|}

See also 
 National Cultural Sites of Uganda for other National Cultural Sites in Uganda

References 

Central
Cultural Heritage Monuments, Central
Central Region, Uganda